Peter Cransberg (born 29 July 1967) is a former Australian rules footballer who played for Essendon in the Australian Football League (AFL) during the 1990s.

Cransberg was picked up by Essendon from East Perth with pick 39 in the 1989 VFL draft. He played on a half forward flank in the 1990 Grand Final but finished on the losing team. Cransberg struggled at times to keep his place in the strong Essendon side, often due to injury, and spent much of his career in the reserves. He did manage to play in a couple of Essendon Night Premierships.

His brother, Alan Cransberg, is the current chairman of the West Coast Eagles.

References

Holmesby, Russell and Main, Jim (2007). The Encyclopedia of AFL Footballers. 7th ed. Melbourne: Bas Publishing.

1967 births
Living people
Australian rules footballers from Western Australia
East Perth Football Club players
Essendon Football Club players
People from Bunbury, Western Australia
South Bunbury Football Club players